The Theaterpreis Berlin is a German theatre award, created in 1988 by the Stiftung Preußische Seehandlung in Berlin. It is awarded annually at the Berliner Theatertreffen to a person in German-language theatre. The prize sum is 20,000 euro.

Recipients
The following have received the prize:

1988 George Tabori
1989 Peter Stein and Karl-Ernst Herrmann
1990 Johann Kresnik
1991 Peter Palitzsch
1992 Jutta Lampe
1993 Botho Strauß
1994 Bernhard Minetti
1995 Claus Peymann and Hermann Beil
1996 Heiner Müller
1997 Pina Bausch
1998 Luc Bondy
1999 Henning Rischbieter
2000 Frank Castorf and Henry Hübchen
2001 Bruno Ganz
2002 Elfriede Jelinek
2003 Bert Neumann
2004 Christoph Marthaler and Anna Viebrock
2005 Peter Konwitschny
2006 Andrea Breth
2007 Ulrich Matthes
2008 Josef Bierbichler
2009 Jürgen Gosch, together with the scenographer Johannes Schütz
2010 Margit Bendokat
2011 Dimiter Gotscheff, Almut Zilcher, Samuel Finzi and Wolfram Koch
2012 Sophie Rois
2013 Jürgen Holtz 
2014 Johan Simons
2015 Corinna Harfouch
2016 Shermin Langhoff and Jens Hillje
2017 Herbert Fritsch
2018 Karin Henkel
2019 She She Pop
2020 Sandra Hüller

References

Awards established in 1988
German theatre awards
Theatre in Berlin